One Full Year is The Secret Handshake's second full-length studio album. It was released on September 25, 2007, on Triple Crown Records.Produced by Cory Kilduff from The Rise. The song "Summer Of '98" was written about growing up in Texas.

Track listing
Too Young
Summer Of '98
Coastal Cities
Wanted You
Everyone Knows Everyone
Denton, TX
Midnight Movie
Gamegirl
Pictures
Make You Mine
Don't Count On Me
I Lied About Everything
Lately
 *crosses fingers*

iTunes bonus tracks:
<li> Breathe In (iTunes bonus track)
<li> Wake Up (iTunes bonus track)

References

2007 albums
Triple Crown Records albums